Aleksandr Aleksejevich Muzychenko (born 7 May 1955) is a retired Soviet/Russian sailor, Olympic champion for the USSR team.

He started to sail in the age of 6, in Omsk, at the river Irtish, He scored his Olympic triumph in star class at the 1980 Summer Olympics in Tallinn,  together with Valentyn Mankin.
Now Aleksandr Muzychenko lives in Latvia, Riga and sails the Dragon class.

Bibliography
 Bibliographic library
 Gazete.ru Re: Moscow – 1980

References

External links
 
 
 
 

1955 births
Living people
Soviet male sailors (sport)
Russian male sailors (sport)
Olympic sailors of the Soviet Union
Olympic gold medalists for the Soviet Union
Olympic medalists in sailing
Sailors at the 1980 Summer Olympics – Star
Sportspeople from Omsk
Medalists at the 1980 Summer Olympics